The Agatha Awards, named for Agatha Christie, are literary awards for mystery and crime writers who write in the traditional mystery subgenre: "books typified by the works of Agatha Christie . . . loosely defined as mysteries that contain no explicit sex, excessive gore or gratuitous violence, and are not classified as 'hard-boiled.'" At an annual convention in Washington, D.C., the Agatha Awards are handed out by Malice Domestic Ltd, in six categories: Best Novel; Best First Mystery; Best Historical Novel; Best Short Story; Best Non-Fiction; Best Children's/Young Adult Mystery.  Additionally, in some years the Poirot Award is presented to honor individuals other than writers who have made outstanding contributions to the mystery genre, but it is not an annual award.

Early meetings of the Malice Domestic Committee occurred in fall 1987, with the first convention held on April 21–23, 1989, in Silver Spring, MD. Malice Domestic Ltd was incorporated in 1992. It is governed by a volunteer board of directors.

Awards
Winners and, where known, nominated titles for each year:

Best First Novel

1980s

1990s

2000s

2010s

2020s

Best Contemporary Novel

2010s

2020s

Best Novel

1980s

1990s

2000s

2010s

Best Historical Novel

2010s

2020s

Best Non-Fiction

1990s

2000s

2010s

2020s

Best Short Story

1980s

1990s

2000s

2010s

2020s

Best Children/Young Adult Fiction

2000s

2010s

2020s

Special Awards

Malice Domestic Award for Lifetime Achievement

Malice Domestic Poirot Award

See also 
 Agatha Christie Award (Japan)
 Agatha-Christie-Krimipreis, a former German literary prize named after Agatha Christie for unpublished crime short stories.

References 

Mystery and detective fiction awards
American literary awards
Awards established in 1989
 
 
1989 establishments in the United States